Freddie Little (born April 25, 1936) is a retired American professional boxer who held the undisputed junior middleweight championship. He used to work at Anthony Saville Middle School in Las Vegas, Nevada as a P.E. teacher but suffered a medical injury and no longer works there

Professional career 
Little turned professional in 1957 and challenged the World light middleweight title against Ki-Soo Kim, but lost by split decision in 1967. In 1968 he challenged for the title against Sandro Mazzinghi. The bout stopped with Mazzinghi bleeding from cuts over both eyes. The ringside officials ruled a "no-contest", though under normal circumstances Little would have won by technical knockout.

In 1969 Little captured the vacant World light middleweight title winning by decision against Stanley Hayward. He defended the belt twice before losing it to Carmelo Bossi in 1970 by decision. He retired in 1972.

Professional boxing record

See also
List of world light-middleweight boxing champions

References

External links

Freddie Little - CBZ Profile

 

1936 births
Living people
People from Picayune, Mississippi
Boxers from Mississippi
American male boxers
African-American boxers
World Boxing Association champions
World Boxing Council champions
Light-middleweight boxers
World light-middleweight boxing champions
21st-century African-American people
20th-century African-American sportspeople